Hip-Hop Show is the first studio album by the Greek singer-songwriter Dispero. It was a whole album with seventeen musical creations and was released by "Ghetolabel" in collaboration with the record company "Universal" on December 16, 2003.

Background and development

From 1996 to 2003 Dispero created his own music with two musical bands with him. Those were: "S.W.Crew" and "Locos Siempre". After the separation of both bands, he used some old songs from S.W.Crew and Locos Siempre and added some of his own songs and he created his first record. The CD had the title "Hip-Hop Show".

Recording and production
"Hip-Hop Show" is a complete album with seventeen musical creations. Thirteen of them are songs, two more are skit, one orchestral intro and one orchestral outro. The total time was 1:03:24. The music was rap, with Hellenic lyrics containing to social messages. The collaborators that took part in the CD/album are the following: Αδάμαντας (Locos Siempre), Sin-Zak-Joe (S.W.Crew), Thuth-Bullet (187), Jamster (031), Alicia (U.G.C.) and Patro-Bill (Κλωνοποιητές). All music productions were created by Dispero and "Ghetolabel recording studios", except the track "187-Locos Siempre" which was created by 187 and granted for their collaboration. Mastering was by "Magnanimous recording studio" based in Thessaloniki, from Petziki George. "Hip-Hop Show" was released on December 16, 2003, in Greece and Cyprus by "Ghetolabel" in collaboration with the record company "Universal".

Cover artwork
Digital designs and artworks were made by Jamster, member of (031) and the photoshoot was by Didgytah, member of "Ghetolabel film maker".

Track listing

References

2003 albums
Hip hop albums by Greek artists